A hunting dog is a canine that hunts with or for humans.

Hunting dog may also refer to:
 African Hunting Dog (Lycaon pictus), a canid native to Sub-Saharan Africa
 Cape hunting dog (Lycaon pictus pictus), the nominate subspecies of African wild dog
 Hottentot Hunting Dog, another name for Africanis, a landrace of Southern African dogs
 Polish Hunting Dog, a breed of scent hound originating in Poland